Esperance Sportive de Zarzis (often referred to as ESZ) is a football club from Zarzis in Tunisia and founded in 1934 by Haj Ali Bouchhioua .

Achievements

Performance in national & domestic competitions
Tunisia Cup: 1
2005

Performance in CAF competitions
CAF Confederation Cup: 1 appearance
2006 – First round

Coaching history

1981–82:
 Thamer Ksiksi
 Mohamed Ali Ben Jeddi
 Bouzommita
1982–83:
 Vassil Romanov
1983–84:
 Vassil Romanov
1984–85:
 Vassil Romanov
1985–86:
 Moncef Arfaoui
1987–88:
 Dimitar Milev
1988–89:
 Dimitar Milev
1989–90:
 Tahar Bellamine
 Belhassen Meriah
1990–91:
 Dimitar Milev
1991–92:
 Dimitar Milev
 Mokhtar Tlili

1992–93:
 Dimitar Milev
 Habib Masmoudi
 Ferid Laaroussi
 Mokhtar Tlili
1994–95:
 Ridha Akacha
1995–96:
 Taoufik Ben Othman
 Mokhtar Tlili
 Khaled Ben Yahya
1996–97:
 Riadh Charfi
 Moncef Arfaoui
 Tijani Mcharek
1997–98:
 Habib Mejri
 Tijani Mcharek
 Mokhtar Tlili
1998–99:
 Serge Devèze
 Mohamed Sraieb
1999–00:
 Ridha Akacha
 Kazimiro

2000–01:
 Ridha Akacha
 Tijani Mcharek
2001–02:
 Serge Devèze
 Mohamed Sraieb
 Noureddine Laabidi
 Mrad Mahjoub
2002–03:
 Mrad Mahjoub
 Moncef Arfaoui
 Khaled Ben Yahya
 Moncef Mcharek
 Mohamed Ben Sliman
2003–04:
 Ridha Akacha
 Ahmed Labiedh
 Lassaad Maamer
2004–05:
 Lassaad Maamer
2005–06:
 Mohamed Sraieb
 Jean-Michel Bruyer

2006–07:
 Abdelhak Benchikha
2007–09:
 Moncef Chargui
 Mokhtar Tlili
 Ahmed Labiedh
 Lassaad Maamer
2009–10:
 Jalel Kadri
 A. Ait Djoudi (Oct 2009 – Dec 09)
 Sofiène Hidoussi
2010–11:
 Chiheb Ellili (July 2010 – June 11)
2011–12:
 Tarek Thabet (July 2011 – Dec 11)
 N. Bourguiba (interim) (Dec 2011)
 Ghazi Ghrairi (Dec 2011 – June 12)
2012–13:
 Ladislas Lozano (July 2012 – Oct 12)
 Kamel Zouaghi (Oct 2012 – Dec 12)
 Lassaad Maamer (Dec 2012–)

External links
eszarzis.com
Official Fans Website

Football clubs in Tunisia
Association football clubs established in 1934
1934 establishments in Tunisia
Sports clubs in Tunisia